The designation HR 163 may refer to:
 The Universal National Service Act, a piece of proposed United States legislation.
 Epsilon Andromedae, a star.